Wallkill River National Wildlife Refuge is part of the National Wildlife Refuge system. Established in 1990 by Public Law 101-593, the refuge straddles  of the Wallkill River at and just south of the New York-New Jersey border. Most of the refuge is in Sussex County, New Jersey, with the remainder in Orange County, New York.  of the Appalachian Trail travel through the refuge, and the refuge has four additional walking trails.

Where compatible, the refuge offers outdoor recreation opportunities including hunting, fishing, interpretation, environmental education, photography, wildlife viewing, hiking, canoeing and cross-country skiing. At the northern end of the refuge, in the black dirt wetlands, the refuge manages a series of waterfowl impoundments for migratory waterfowl and shorebirds. Wood ducks, canvasbacks, mergansers, mallards and many other species frequent the refuge during spring and fall migrations. Raptors commonly use the refuge as well, with red-shouldered hawks, northern harriers and kestrels frequently observed.

References

External links
 Wallkill River National Wildlife Refuge

National Wildlife Refuges in New York (state)
National Wildlife Refuges in New Jersey
Wallkill River
Protected areas of Sussex County, New Jersey
Protected areas of Orange County, New York
Wetlands of New Jersey
Landforms of Sussex County, New Jersey
Landforms of Orange County, New York
Wetlands of New York (state)
Protected areas established in 1990
1990 establishments in New Jersey
1990 establishments in New York (state)